Gunawan is a common Indonesian surname it may refer to:

People
Henricus Pidyarto Gunawan, Indonesian Roman Catholic bishop
Raden Goenawan, Indonesian Prosecutor General 1959-62
Rudy Gunawan, Chinese Indonesian badminton player
Tony Gunawan, Indonesian-born badminton player of Chinese descent

Other
Gunawan Steel Group, Indonesian steel company group

Indonesian-language surnames